Veronica barkeri, synonym Hebe barkeri, is a species of plant in the family Plantaginaceae. It is endemic to the Chatham Islands. It is threatened by habitat loss.

References

barkeri
Flora of the Chatham Islands
Vulnerable plants
Taxonomy articles created by Polbot